Valerie Grove (née Smith, born 11 May 1946) is a British journalist and author, who for many years worked as a feature writer, interviewer and columnist for The Times newspaper.

Grove was born in South Shields. Her father, William Douglas "Doug" Smith (1916–73), was a cartoonist for the Shields Gazette and other newspapers. Grove was an undergraduate at Girton College, Cambridge from 1965, graduating from Cambridge University in 1968 with a degree in English. She joined the London Evening Standard in the year of her graduation, initially working on Londoner's Diary then as a feature writer, eventually becoming the newspaper's literary editor for two spells (1979–81 and 1984–87). She left the Standard in 1987. After this she wrote for The Sunday Times (1987–91) and The Times (1992–2014).

Grove's book The Compleat Woman: Marriage, Motherhood, Career - Can She Have it All? appeared in 1987. The volume contains interviews with prominent women of the time, married for at least 25 years and with three or more children.

Grove is a biographer of the writers Dodie Smith (1996), Laurie Lee (1999) and John Mortimer (2007). So Much To Tell, a biography of the children's book editor Kaye Webb, was published in May 2010.

Previously known professionally as Valerie Jenkins; she married David Byrnmor Jenkins in 1968, but the couple later divorced. (Her first book Where I Was Young - Memories of London Childhoods was published in 1976, under her former name.) She married Trevor Grove in 1975. Her second husband is a former editor of The Sunday Telegraph.

References

1946 births
Living people
Alumni of Girton College, Cambridge
British journalists
The Times people